Pumper Nic (shortened to Pumper after 1989) was a popular chain of fast-food restaurants in Argentina that existed in the 1970s and 1980s. It is currently considered by many Argentines to be a cult classic. Its name is derived from the German pumpernickel, a type of bread.

History

Pumper Nic was created by Alfredo Lowenstein in 1974, also an ex-owner of Quickfood, parent company of the renowned Argentine beef hamburger supplier Paty –which was in turn founded by his brother Ernesto–, and the Las Leñas tourist complex. In 1975 the company became Argentina's first franchise and quickly expanded throughout the country, reaching a total of 70 restaurants and an annual revenue of 60 million dollars. The chain's rapid growth made it extremely difficult for its headquarters in Buenos Aires to keep a grip on the franchisees. A combination of poor management and a lack of standardization caused food quality to vary greatly between the restaurants.

Pumper Nic's logo was based upon Burger King's, before the latter began operating in Argentina. When McDonald's and Burger King opened their first venues in the country in 1986 and 1989 respectively, Pumper Nic was forced to change its logo and have its name shortened to Pumper due to a lawsuit by Burger King.

Lowenstein handed over Pumper Nic in 1990 to his sons Diego and Paula, who had little interest in running the business. The family sold the chain in 1995 and started from scratch by associating themselves with Wendy's, which had just opened its first restaurant in the country. Furthermore, the franchise system collapsed in its entirety the following year. Pumper Nic's new owners, real estate agents Goldstein and Rosenbaum, were unable to relaunch the company. Unable to compete with larger American fast-food chains, Pumper Nic finally declared bankruptcy in early 1999.

A last Pumper Nic restaurant is still remained opened in Moreno, until now.

Products

Pumper Nic's signature sandwich was the Mobur, a sandwich with an egg in between. One of their famous menu items was Dos por uno − two burgers for the price of one. French fries were called Frenys. Names of other Pumper Nic sandwiches include: Jaque (jamon y queso, ham and cheese) and Jaque'H.

Slogans
Their most famous tagline was "Pumper Nic, the new way of dining" (Spanish: La nueva forma de comer).

In popular culture
Nic the hippo is featured among the animals that escape from the Los Angeles Zoo during an earthquake that hits Los Angeles in the Oscar-winning animated short film Logorama (2009).

See also
 List of fast-food restaurants
 List of defunct fast-food restaurant chains

References

Defunct fast-food chains
Defunct restaurants in Argentina
Fast-food chains of Argentina
Fast-food franchises
Food and drink companies based in Buenos Aires